Partido, partidista and partidario may refer to:

 Spanish for a political party, people who share political ideology or who are brought together by common issues

Territorial subdivision
 Partidos of Buenos Aires, the second-level administrative subdivision in the Province of Buenos Aires, Argentina
 Partidos of Chile, a third-level subdivision in Colonial Chile below intendencias, also known as corregimientos
 Judicial district, shortened from partido judicial in some Spanish-speaking countries
 Partido (region), a non-autonomous administrative region during the times of the Spanish Empire in the Americas

Places
 Partido (historical province), a district in Camarines Sur, Philippines, and a historical province of the Philippines
 Partido, Dominican Republic, a town in Dajabón Province of the Dominican Republic